Paracymoriza ectargyralis is a moth in the family Crambidae. It was described by George Hampson in 1897. It is found on New Guinea (Fergusson Island) and on the Solomon Islands.

References

Acentropinae
Moths described in 1897